The Men's team pursuit competition at the 2018 UCI Track Cycling World Championships was held on 28 February and 1 March 2018.

Results

Qualifying
The eight fastest teams advance to the first round.

First round
First round heats were held as follows:
Heat 1: 6th v 7th fastest
Heat 2: 5th v 8th fastest
Heat 3: 2nd v 3rd fastest
Heat 4: 1st v 4th fastest

The winners of heats 3 and 4 proceeded to the gold medal race. The remaining six teams were ranked on time, from which the top two proceeded to the bronze medal race.

 QG = qualified for gold medal final
 QB = qualified for bronze medal final

Finals
The final was held at 19:23.

References

Men's team pursuit
UCI Track Cycling World Championships – Men's team pursuit